Kumbarkoppa is a village in Dharwad district of Karnataka, India.

Demographics 
As of the 2011 Census of India there were 430 households in Kumbarkoppa and a total population of 2,073 consisting of 1,053 males and 1,020 females. There were 301 children ages 0-6.

References

Villages in Dharwad district